Carlos Manuel Bustos (born 6 June 1974) is an Argentine alpine skier. He competed in the men's super-G at the 1994 Winter Olympics.

References

External links
 

1974 births
Living people
Argentine male alpine skiers
Olympic alpine skiers of Argentina
Alpine skiers at the 1994 Winter Olympics
Sportspeople from Bariloche